Hinduism in Afghanistan is practiced by a tiny minority of Afghans, believed to be about 30-40 individuals as of 2021, who live mostly in the cities of Kabul and Jalalabad. Afghan Hindus are ethnically Pashtun, Hindkowan (Hindki), Punjabi, or Sindhi and primarily speak Pashto, Hindko, Punjabi, Sindhi, Dari, and Hindustani (Hindi-Urdu).

Before the Islamic conquest of Afghanistan, the Afghan people were multi-religious. Religious persecution, discrimination, and forced conversion of Hindus in Afghanistan perpetrated by Muslims, has caused the Afghan Hindus, along with Buddhist and Sikh population, to dwindle from Afghanistan, and mostly to India.

During the 1970s, the Afghan Hindu population was estimated to number between 80,000 and 280,000, or 0.7% to 2.5% of the national population at the time. However, the population rapidly declined thereafter due to the Afghan wars along with continued persecution, discrimination and forced conversion.

Background
Apart from the Hindkowans, the Indo-Aryan native inhabitants of the region, including Pashayi and Nuristanis, were also known to be followers of a sect of Ancient Hinduism, mixed with tribal cultural identities. Pashtuns, the majority ethnic group in Afghanistan (officially, no ethnic census ever made), have a component of Vedic ancestors from the Pakthas. 

Gandhara, a region encompassing the South-east of Afghanistan, was also a center of Hinduism since the time of the Vedic Period, along with Buddhism. Later forms of Hinduism were also prevalent in this south-eastern region of the country during the Turk shahis, with Khair Khaneh, a Brahmanical temple being excavated in Kabul and a statue of Gardez Ganesha being found in Paktia province. Most of the remains, including marble statuettes, date to the 7th–8th century, during the time of the Turk Shahi. The statue of Ganesha from Gardez is now attributed to the period of Turk Shahis in the 7-8th century CE, rather than to their successors the Hindu Shahis (9th-10th century) as has also been suggested. The dating is essentially based on stylistic analysis, as the statue displays great iconographical and stylistic similarities with the works of the Buddhist monastery of Fondukistan, which is also dated to the same period.Hinduism further flourished under the rule of Hindu Shahis, but went into sharp decline with the advent of Islam through the Ghaznavids, who defeated the Shahis. Nonetheless, it continued as a significant minority in Afghanistan until the 21st century, when its number of followers fell to a few hundred.

History

Prehistory and ancient period (3300–550 BCE) 
There is no reliable information on when Hinduism began in Afghanistan but historians suggest that the territory south of the Hindu Kush may have been culturally connected with the Indus Valley civilization (3300–2000 BCE) in ancient times.

By roughly 2000–1500 BCE, Indo-Aryan inhabitants of the region (mainly in the eastern and southern parts of present-day Afghanistan) were adherents of Hinduism. Notable among these were the Gandharis and Kambojas. The Pashayi and Nuristanis are present day examples of these Indo-Aryan Vedic people.

Persian, Greek, and Mauryan periods (550–150 BCE) 
Most historians maintain that Afghanistan was inhabited by ancient Arians followed by the Achaemenid before the arrival of Alexander the Great and his Greek army in 330 BC. It became part of the Seleucid Empire after the departure of Alexander three years later. In 305 BCE, the Seleucid Empire lost control of the territory south of the Hindu Kush to the Indian Emperor "Sandrocottus" as a result of the Seleucid-Mauryan War.

Classical period (150 BCE–650 CE) 
When the Chinese travelers Faxian, Song Yun, and Xuanzang explored Afghanistan between the 5th and 7th centuries CE, they wrote numerous travelogues in which reliable information on Afghanistan was stored. They stated that Buddhism was practiced in different parts between the Amu Darya (Oxus River) in the north and the Indus River. However, they did not mention much about Hinduism although Song Yun did state that the Hephthalite rulers did not recognize Buddhism but "preached pseudo gods and killed animals for their meat".

Turk & Kabul Shahi, Zunbil dynasty (650–850 CE) 
Before the Islamic conquest of Afghanistan, the territory was a religious sediment of Zoroastrianism, Zunbils, Hinduism and Buddhism. It was inhabited by various peoples, including Persians, Khalaj, Turks, and Pashtuns. Parts of the territory South of Hindu kush were ruled by the Zunbils, offspring of the southern-Hephthalite. The eastern parts (Kabulistan) were controlled by the Turk Shahis.

The Zunbil and Kabul Shahis were connected with the Indian subcontinent through common Buddhism and Zun religions. The Zunbil kings worshipped a sun god by the name of Zun, from which they derived their name. André Wink writes that "the cult of Zun was primarily Hindu, not Buddhist or Zoroastrian"; nonetheless he still mentions them having parallels with Tibetan Buddhism and Zoroastrianism in their rituals.

The Kabul Shahi ruled north of the Zunbil territory, which included Kabulistan and Gandahara. The General of the Arab army "broke of a hand of the idol and plucked out the rubies which were its eyes in order to persuade the Marzbān of Sīstān of the god's worthlessness."

Though the early Arab invaders spread the message of Islam, they were not able to rule for long. Hence, many contemporary ethnic groups in Afghanistan, including the Pashtuns, Kalash, Pashayi, Nuristanis and Hindkowans continued to practice Hinduism, Buddhism, and Zoroastrianism. The Kabul Shahis decided to build a giant wall around the city to prevent more Arab invasions, and this wall is still visible today.

Hindu Shahi (850–1000 CE) 

Willem Vogelsang in his 2002 book writes: "During the 8th and 9th centuries AD the eastern terroritries of modern Afghanistan were still in the hands of non-Muslim rulers. The Muslims tended to regard them as Indians (Hindus), although many of the local rulers and people were apparently of Hunnic or Turkic descent. Yet, the Muslims were right in so far as the non-Muslim population of eastern Afghanistan was, culturally linked to the Indian sub-continent. Most of them were either Hindus or Buddhists. "

In 870 AD the Saffarids from medieval Zaranj, located at the Nad-e Ali site of modern-day Iran (not to be confused with the similarly named modern city of Zaranj in Afghanistan), conquered most of Afghanistan, establishing Muslim governors throughout the land. It is reported that Muslims and non-Muslims still lived side by side before the arrival of the Ghaznavids in the 10th century.

The first confirmed mention of a Hindu in Afghanistan appears in the 982 AD Ḥudūd al-ʿĀlam, where it speaks of a king in "Ninhar" (Nangarhar), who shows a public display of conversion to Islam, even though he had over 30 wives, which are described as "Muslim, Afghan, and Hindu" wives. These names were often used as geographical terms. For example, Hindu (or Hindustani) has been historically used as a geographical term to describe someone who was native from the region known as Hindustan (Indian subcontinent), and Afghan as someone who was native from a region called Afghanistan.

Decline (1000–1800 CE) 

When Sultan Mahmud of Ghazni began crossing the Indus River into Hindustan (land of Hindus) in the 10th century, the Ghaznavid Muslims began bringing Hindu slaves to what is now Afghanistan. Martin Ewans in his 2002 book writes:

Al-Idirisi testifies that until as late as the 12th century, a contract of investiture for every Shahi king was performed at Kabul and that here he was obliged to agree to certain ancient conditions which completed the contract. The Ghaznavid military incursions assured the domination of Sunni Islam in what is now Afghanistan and Pakistan. Various historical sources such as Martin Ewans, E.J. Brill and Farishta have recorded the introduction of Islam to Kabul and other parts of Afghanistan to the conquests of and Mahmud:

Mahmud used his plundered wealth to finance his armies which included mercenaries. The Indian soldiers, presumably Hindus, who were one of the components of the army with their commander called sipahsalar-i-Hinduwan lived in their quarter of Ghazna practicing their own religion. Indian soldiers under their commander Suvendhray remained loyal to Mahmud. They were also used against a Turkic rebel, with the command given to a Hindu named Tilak according to Baihaki.

In his war on Peshawar and Waihind says al-Utbi, Mahmud acquired 500,000 slaves that included children and girls. Men were sold as slaves to even common merchants. The amount of slaves captured in Nardin plummeted their price and male slaves were even bought by common merchants. After raiding Thanesar, he acquired 200,000 slaves.

The renowned 14th-century Moroccan Muslim scholar Ibn Battuta remarked that the Hindu Kush meant the "slayer of Indians", because slaves brought from India who had to pass through there died in large numbers due to the extreme cold and quantity of snow.

The Ghaznavid Empire was further expanded by the Ghurids. During the Khalji dynasty, there was also free movement between people from India and Afghanistan. It continued this way until the Mughals followed by the Suris and the Durranis.

Modern period
The main ethnic groups in Afghanistan which practice Hinduism today are the Punjabis and Sindhis who are believed to have come along with Sikhs as merchants to Afghanistan in the 19th century. Till the collapse of the Democratic Republic of Afghanistan, there were several thousand Hindus living in the country but today their number is only about 1,000. Most of the others immigrated to India, the European Union, North America or elsewhere.

Afghan Hindus and Afghan Sikhs often share places of worship. Along with the Sikhs, they are all collectively known as Hindki. Linguistic demographics among the Hindu community are diverse and generally follow regional origins: those hailing from Punjab generally speak Punjabi, Sindhis speak Sindhi, and the northern and southern dialects of Hindko. The local Hindu community in Afghanistan is mostly based in the city of Kabul. The 2002 loya jirga had two seats reserved for Hindus and former President Hamid Karzai's economic advisor, Sham Lal Bhatija was an Afghan Hindu.

During the Taliban 1996 to late 2001 rule, Hindus were forced to wear yellow badges in public to identify themselves as non-Muslims. Hindu women were forced to wear burqas, a measure which was claimed to "protect" them from harassment. This was part of the Taliban's plan to segregate "un-Islamic" and "idolatrous" communities from Islamic ones.

The decree was condemned by the Indian and U.S. governments as a violation of religious freedom. Widespread protests against the Taliban regime broke out in Bhopal, India. In the United States, Abraham Foxman, chairman of the Anti-Defamation League, compared the decree to the practices of Nazi Germany, where Jews were required to wear labels identifying them as such. Several influential lawmakers in the United States wore yellow badges with the inscription "I am a Hindu", on the floor of the Senate during the debate as a demonstration of their solidarity with the Hindu minority in Afghanistan.

Since the 1990s, many Afghan Hindus have fled the country, seeking asylum in countries such as India, Germany and United States.

In July 2013, the Afghan parliament refused to reserve seats for the minority group as a bill reserving seats for the mentioned was voted against. The bill by the then president Hamid Karzai, had tribal people and "women" as "vulnerable groups" who got reservation, but not religious minorities as per the religious equality article in the constitution.

Notable people
Atma Ram – Afghan Minister and Author.
Celina Jaitley – Indian Bollywood actress born to an Indian father, Colonel V. K. Jaitly and an Afghan Hindu mother, Meeta Jaitly, who was also from Kabul and was a nurse in the Indian Army.
Annet Mahendru – American actress born in Kabul to an Indian father,  Ghanshan "Ken" Mahendru whose family had moved from Delhi to Afghanistan for business and a Russian mother, Olga.

Diaspora

As both populations are frequently merged in historic and contemporary estimations, the population ratio between Afghan Sikhs and Hindus is estimated to be 60:40 according to historian Inderjeet Singh.

With a wide range of population approximations in the absence of official census data and with much of the community concentrated in the provinces of Kabul, Nangarhar, Ghazni, and Kandahar, the Afghan Hindu population was estimated to be between 80,000 and 280,000 in the 1970s, as per estimates by historian Inderjeet Singh, Ehsan Shayegan with the Porsesh Research and Studies Organisation and Rawail Singh, an Afghan Sikh civil rights activist.

In the time of 1980's after the Afghan civil war 1979 the population of Hindus and Sikh fell at a very fast rate due to Taliban's rise to power and religious persecution and discrimination and they migrated from Afghanistan to other countries, The continue rise of Islamization and Taliban insurgency also contributed in the diaspora. The decline was seen mostly in Pashtuns-dominated areas,due to Pashtunistan and Pashtun nationalism, with the Afghan Hindu population declining to 3,000 by 2009.

As per the 2017 data, more than 99% of Afghan Sikhs and Hindus have left the country in the last 3 decades. Many of Afghan Hindus and Sikhs have been settled in Germany, France, United States, Australia, India, Belgium, the Netherlands and other nations.

The Afghan Hindu population declined to approximately 50 in 2020. Later, following the Fall of Kabul in 2021, the Government of India evacuated many Sikhs and Hindus out of the country due to the Taliban takeover. As a result, only one Hindu priest remains in the nation today, also acting as Temple guard.

Demographics

Ancient Hindu temples

See also

 Hinduism by country
 Religion in Afghanistan
 Jainism in Afghanistan
 Sikhism in Afghanistan
 Buddhism in Afghanistan
 Pre-Islamic Hindu and Buddhist heritage of Afghanistan
 Khatri
 Punjabis in Afghanistan
 Hindkowan
Kalash people
Burusho people
Kafiristan
Hindu Kush

Notes

References

Sources

External links

 
 
 

 
Afghanistan
Ancient history of Afghanistan
Archaeological sites in Afghanistan
History of religion in Afghanistan